Harry Elte (born with the name Hartog Elte, Amsterdam, 3 September 1880 – Theresienstadt, 1 April 1944) was a Jewish-Dutch architect. His style is that of the Amsterdam School.

Elte was educated by Berlage. He designed several synagogues and villa's in the Netherlands, as well as a football stadium. For his parents, he designed grave stones on the Jewish cemetery of Muiderberg.

During World War II he was deported and died in the Theresienstadt concentration camp.

References

External links

Jewish architects
1880 births
1944 deaths
Architects from Amsterdam
Dutch Jews
Dutch people who died in the Theresienstadt Ghetto
20th-century Dutch architects